Stephen Hopkins is a Jamaican-born British-Australian director and producer of film and television. He directed Predator 2, A Nightmare on Elm Street 5: The Dream Child, Blown Away, The Life and Death of Peter Sellers, Lost in Space and Under Suspicion. He also produced and directed several episodes of the first season of 24.

Career

Film
In Australia Hopkins made Dangerous Game (1987). This helped him get the job directing A Nightmare on Elm Street 5: The Dream Child. Hopkins later said, "I went at it like a dog, and had a wild, fun time. But when I look back, I think I'm the luckiest guy in the world because I don't understand how it all happened."

He went on to make Predator 2, of which he said, "I'm pretty immature, really, so it was kind of a laugh". He followed it with Judgment Night ("a real, absolute, total bomb" according to Hopkins), Blown Away ("made a lot of mistakes") and The Ghost and the Darkness ("It was a mess. I haven't been able to watch it.").

In 2016, Hopkins directed Race, a biopic about athlete Jesse Owens for Focus Features. Stephan James plays Jesse Owens, opposite Jason Sudeikis and Jeremy Irons. The film was released in February 2016.

Hopkins said that after Predator 2 he "looked around for a good film for a long time, and I couldn't get anything I wanted to do... I didn't realise the Hollywood trick. In American action movies, people get shot to death and their arms are blown off, and they get up and they're fine. These films are supposed to be fun things that people can laugh at. I always thought, 'That's wrong, that's not what violence is like.' I took these films too seriously and tried to add profound depths, and that's not what's wanted. You either do that film or you do the other one, but I kept mixing the two up, and probably unsuccessfully.'"

Television

Hopkins has directed a number of episodes for television. He was a co-executive producer for the first season of the Fox action drama 24, and also directed half of the season's episodes, including the first and last episodes. He is also co-executive producer on 24: Legacy, and director of the show's pilot episode. Hopkins has also directed a number of episodes of Showtime's series House of Lies starring Don Cheadle which premiered on 8 January 2012. He is also a producer on the series.

In 2004, Hopkins directed the controversial biographical film The Life and Death of Peter Sellers, which was broadcast by HBO in the United States but received a theatrical release in a number of countries. The film provoked the ire of the actor's son Michael Sellers and won an Emmy Award for Outstanding Directing for a Miniseries, Movie or a Dramatic Special.

in 2019 Hopkins directed the pilot episode for a potential The Dark Tower series for Amazon. However Amazon passed on the series.

In 2023 Hopkins directed the 6 episode globe trotting spy thriller Liaison starring Vincent Cassel and Eva Green. He is also a producer on the series.

Filmography

Film

Television

References

External links
 
 

Living people
British film producers
British film directors
Place of birth missing (living people)
People educated at Sutton Valence School
Primetime Emmy Award winners
Horror film directors
Year of birth missing (living people)